The Scaled Composites Model 318 White Knight (now also called White Knight One) is a jet-powered carrier aircraft that was used to launch its companion SpaceShipOne, an experimental spaceplane. The White Knight and SpaceShipOne were designed by Burt Rutan and manufactured by Scaled Composites, a private company founded by Rutan in 1982. On three separate flights in 2004, White Knight conducted SpaceShipOne into flight, and SpaceShipOne then performed a sub-orbital spaceflight, becoming the first private craft to reach space.

The White Knight is notable as an example of a mother ship which carried a parasite aircraft into flight, releasing the latter which would then execute a high-altitude flight, or a sub-orbital spaceflight. This flight profile is shared with The High and Mighty One and Balls 8, two modified B-52s which carried the North American X-15 into flight. It is also shared with White Knight Two, a descendant which carries SpaceShipTwo into flight as part of the Virgin Galactic fleet.

Following the SpaceShipOne flights, the White Knight was contracted for drop tests of the Boeing X-37 spaceplane, from June 2005 until April 2006. The White Knight was retired from service in 2014, and is in the inventory of the Flying Heritage Collection.

Design and development

The Scaled Composites model number for White Knight is 318. White Knight is registered with the Federal Aviation Administration as 

The White Knight carrier airplane was designed around the twin afterburning General Electric J85 engines, which were selected for their availability and low cost. The aircraft was a completely new independent design. White Knight and SpaceShipOne shared the same forward fuselage outer mold line (OML) to reduce development costs and with the original intent to allow for White Knight to act as a flying simulator for training SpaceShipOne pilots. White Knight first flew on August 1, 2002. The flight was aborted shortly after takeoff due to a problem with the outboard wing spoilers. These trailing edge spoilers were designed to greatly increase the glide slope so that the White Knight vehicle could act as a flying simulator for training of SpaceShipOne pilots. During the first flight, the mechanical over-center torque was insufficient to maintain the spoilers in the closed position. The spoilers deployed into the free stream and began a limit cycle forcing the pilot (Mike Melvill) to abort. The spoilers were subsequently disabled completely and the desire for a steep glide slope matching SpaceShipOne was abandoned.

White Knight next flew on August 5, 2002, and this time performed well. Development proceeded over the next few months. With White Knight developed and evaluated, on April 18, 2003, White Knight and SpaceShipOne were presented to the media.

Subsequently, White Knight flew as part of the Tier One program that won the Ansari X Prize on October 4, 2004.

Afterwards, White Knight was used to carry and launch DARPA's experimental X-37 spaceplane for its approach and landing tests in 2005 and 2006.

It was followed up by the White Knight Two, which has a similar but larger design.

SpaceShipOne program
Flights of White Knight are numbered, starting with flight 1 on August 1, 2002. Flights where SpaceShipOne was carried also get one or two appended letters. An appended "C" indicates that the flight was a captive carry, and "L" indicates that SpaceShipOne was launched. If the flight actually flown differs in category from the intended flight, then two letters are appended, the first giving the intended mission and the second the mission actually performed.

X-37 test program
White Knight was contracted to perform both captive carry and drop test flights of the DARPA/Boeing X-37. First captive carry flight was on June 21, 2005, and first drop was on April 7, 2006 (the X-37 was subsequently damaged on landing at Edwards Air Force Base). Initially, the flights originated from Mojave, but following the landing incident, the program was moved to Air Force Plant 42 in Palmdale, California, and at least five subsequent flights were made there.

Adaptive Compliant Wing test program
In late 2006, White Knight flew a seven-flight test program of the adaptive compliant wing developed by FlexSys Inc. with funding by the Air Force Research Laboratory. A laminar flow test article was mounted vertically under White Knight's centerline pylon for the 20-flight-hour research program that tested the flexible wing's aerodynamic characteristics.

Retirement to museum
In July 2014 White Knight made its final planned flight, arriving at Paine Field in Everett, Washington, to become part of the Flying Heritage Collection.

Specifications

Other features and capabilities
 Carriage and launch of payloads up to 7,000 lbs
 Altitude capability above 53,000 ft
 Large, three-place cabin (60-inch diameter outside, 59-inch inside)
 Sea level cabin qualified for unlimited altitude
 ECS scrubs CO2, removes humidity and defogs windows
 Two crew doors with dual seals and dual-pane windows
 Manual flight controls with three-axis electric trim
 Avionics include INS-GPS navigator, flight-director, flight test data (recording and T/M), air-data, vehicle health monitoring, backup flight instruments, and video system
 The 82 ft wing can be extended to 93 ft for increased climb capability
 Super-effective, pneumatic speed brakes allow steep descent with L/D < 4.5
 Hydraulic wheel brakes and nose-gear steering
 Pneumatic main gear retraction
 Dual-bus electrical power system
 Cockpit allows single-pilot operation (VMC-day conditions only)

See also
 Flying aircraft carrier
 Scaled Composites Stratolaunch

References

External links

 Scaled Composites' Tier One website 
 White Knight's FAA registration
 WhiteKnight to launch X-37 test flights

SpaceShipOne
White Knight
Scaled Composites Tier One program
2000s United States experimental aircraft
Twin-boom aircraft
Aircraft first flown in 2002
Aircraft related to spaceflight